John A. "Bull" Schweder (December 23, 1927June 9, 2005) was a professional American football player who played offensive lineman for six seasons for the Baltimore Colts and Pittsburgh Steelers.

References

External links

1927 births
2005 deaths
Players of American football from Philadelphia
American football offensive linemen
Penn Quakers football players
Pittsburgh Steelers players
Baltimore Colts (1947–1950) players